The 2009–10 LNB Pro A season was the 88th season of the French Basketball Championship and the 23rd season since inception of the Ligue Nationale de Basketball (LNB). The regular season started on October 3, 2009 and ended on May 11, 2010. The play-offs were held from May 18, 2010 till June 13, 2010.

Cholet Basket, after finishing first of the regular season, won the French Pro A League by defeating Le Mans SB in playoffs final (81-65).

Promotion and relegation 
 At the beginning of the 2009–10 season
Teams promoted from 2008 to 2009 Pro B (French 2nd division)
 Poitiers
 Paris-Levallois

Teams relegated to 2009–10 Pro B
 Besançon
 Pau-Orthez

 At the end of the 2009–10 season
 2009-10 Pro A Champion: Cholet Basket

Teams promoted from 2009 to 2010 Pro B
 Pau-Lacq-Orthez
 Limoges

Teams relegated to 2010–11 Pro B
 Rouen
 Dijon

Team arenas

Team standings

Playoffs

Stats Leaders

Awards

Regular Season MVPs 
 Foreign MVP:  Ricardo Greer (Nancy)
 French MVP:  Ali Traore (Lyon-Villeurbanne)

Finals MVP 
  Mickaël Gelabale (Cholet)

Best Coach 
  Ruddy Nelhomme (Poitiers)

Most Improved Player 
  Kevin Seraphin (Cholet)

Best Defensive Player 
  John Linehan (Cholet)

Rising Star Award 
  Andrew Albicy (Paris-Levallois)

Player of the month

References

External links
  LNB website

LNB Pro A seasons
French
basketball
basketball